Thornquist or Thörnquist is a surname. Notable people with the surname include:

Annika Thörnquist (born 1971), Swedish pop music singer
Heidi Thornquist, American applied mathematician
Lillian Thornquist, harpist on Aura (Miles Davis album)

Swedish-language surnames